The following is a list of Major League Baseball players, retired or active.

He through Hi

References

External links
Last Names starting with H – Baseball-Reference.com

 He